Peter Legh may refer to:

 Peter Legh (died 1642), Member of Parliament for Newton
 Peter Legh (MP for Cheshire), Member of Parliament for Cheshire and Wigan
 Peter Legh (died 1672), Member of Parliament for Newton
 Peter Legh (died 1744), Member of Parliament for Newton
 Peter Legh (1706–1792), Member of Parliament for Newton
 Peter Legh (1723–1804), Member of Parliament for Ilchester
 Peter Legh, 4th Baron Newton (1915–1992), British Conservative politician, Member of Parliament for Petersfield